Tooman is a 2020 Iranian drama film directed and written by Morteza Farshbaf. 
The film screened for the first time at the 38th Fajr Film Festival and earned 4 nominations and received 1 award. Morteza Najafi won a Crystal Simorgh for Best Cinematography.

Premise 
Davood bets his entire earning from a factory job on online soccer gambling; without ever losing on any game, he bets till he loses his life and love.

Cast 

 Mirsaeed Molavian as Davood
 Mojtaba Pirzadeh as Aziz
 Pardis Ahmadieh as Aylin
 Iman Sayad Borhani as Younes
 Hamed Nejabat as Ali
 Sajad Babaei as Mohammad

Music 
The soundtrack of this film is composed by Mohammad Reza Heidari. The opening music is "Katip Arzuhalim Yaz Yare Böyle" from Selda Bağcan and the ending music of the film is "Lucy" sung by He and His Friends.

Reception

Accolades

References

External links 

 

2020s Persian-language films
Iranian drama films
2020 drama films